Rita Kühne (later Andrich then Schiemann; born 5 January 1947, in Dresden) is a former East German athlete who competed mainly in the 400 metres.

She competed for East Germany in the 1972 Summer Olympics held in Munich, Germany in the 4 × 400 metres where she won the gold medal with her team mates Dagmar Käsling, Helga Seidler and 400m gold medalist Monika Zehrt.

External links
 
 

1947 births
Living people
Athletes from Dresden
East German female sprinters
Olympic athletes of East Germany
Athletes (track and field) at the 1972 Summer Olympics
Olympic gold medalists for East Germany
European Athletics Championships medalists
Medalists at the 1972 Summer Olympics
Olympic gold medalists in athletics (track and field)
Recipients of the Patriotic Order of Merit in silver
Olympic female sprinters